The Hyblean ricotta is a dairy product derived from the whey produced in Libero consorzio comunale di Ragusa and is recognized as prodotto agroalimentare tradizionale since 2000.

Milk
The milk used to produce the classic  is that of the wild and autochthonous breed Modicana, producer of Protected Designation of Origin milk, bred in the wild mainly on the highlands between Modica and Ragusa
in the pastures enclosed in the classic dry stone walls characteristic of the area. Iblea ricotta can also be produced with mixed milk, that is, deriving from various breeds, with the addition of whole and raw milk up to 10%. Ragusan milk has unique characteristics, containing hints of spontaneous Hyblaean mountain vegetation such as fresh mushrooms, orange, freshly cut grass and floral traces typical of the area, such as calendula, anthemis, malva silvestris, geranium, and jasmine.

Preparation 
The preparation procedure takes place according to the traditional Ragusan method, different from other processes.

Consumption of hot ricotta
For the consumption of freshly made ricotta, in the various farms scattered throughout the territory, typical terracotta cups are used which have a mixed shape between a soup plate and a bowl, usually it is accompanied with homemade bread.

Use in the pastry shop
Contrary to the pastry tradition of most of Sicily, which uses sheep ricotta, Hyblean ricotta is traditionally used in the local pastry and in some areas of the  Syracusan.

References

Cuisine of Sicily
Italian cheeses
Cow's-milk cheeses
Whey cheeses